Stephen Weeks is a British film director, writer, and producer. He started making films when was 16 and made his featured debut aged 22 with I, Monster.

Select filmography
I, Monster (1972)
Gawain and the Green Knight (1973)
Ghost Story (1974)
Scars (1976)
Sword of the Valiant (1983)
The Bengal Lancers! (1984)

References

External links

Living people
British film directors
Year of birth missing (living people)